Jinghu South Circuit or Jinghu South Province was one of the circuits during the Song dynasty. Its administrative area corresponds roughly to the modern province of Hunan.

Jinghu South Circuit and Jinghu North Circuit were split from Jinghu Circuit in 998.

References

 
 

 
Circuits of the Song dynasty
998 establishments
10th-century establishments in China
Former circuits in Hunan